Mawes may refer to:
 Saint Maudez, known in Cornwall as Mauwes, a Breton saint
 St Mawes, a town in Cornwall, England
 Mawes language, a Papuan language of Indonesia

See also 
 Maws (disambiguation)
 Maves